Mount Mahood was named in 1871. It is located in the Victoria Cross Ranges in Alberta.

See also
 Mountains of Alberta

References

Mahood
Alberta's Rockies